The Droungarios of the Watch (droungarios tēs viglēs/viglas), sometimes anglicized as "Drungary of the Watch", was originally a senior Byzantine military post. Attested since the late 8th century, the droungarios commanded the Vigla or "Watch", one of the elite professional cavalry regiments (tagmata) of the middle Byzantine period, and was in charge of the Byzantine emperor's personal security. From , the office was disassociated from its military origin and was transformed into a senior judicial position, thereafter usually referred to as the Grand Droungarios of the Watch (μέγας δρουγγάριος τῆς βίγλης/βίγλας, megas droungarios tēs viglēs/viglas). The office continued to exist as a mostly honorific court dignity in the Palaiologan era, until the very end of the Byzantine Empire in the mid-15th century.

Military office
The Droungarios of the Watch was originally the commander of the Vigla ("guard watch") or Arithmos ("number"), the third of the tagmata, professional cavalry regiments headquartered in and around Constantinople, and distinct from the provincial or thematic troops. The title of droungarios itself means "commander of a droungos",  a term of Gaulish origin which came to be used as a term for a kind of tactical cavalry formation in the East Roman army of Late Antiquity. The term droungarios (Greek: δρουγγάριος) is not documented before the early 7th century but might have been used as an informal or unofficial designation before that date. The office and the corresponding unit appear to have initially referred to ad hoc arrangements, but during the early 7th century these were formalized, like much of the East Roman army's rank structure.

Judging from the unit's name and the peculiar titles of its officers, it also had a considerable ancestry, dating back to the East Roman army, but it is unknown exactly when it was constituted as a tagma. The office of the Droungarios of the Watch at any rate is first attested , when Alexios Mosele is recorded as "spatharios and droungarios of the Watch". In contrast to the other tagmata, the Watch and its commanders had special duties related to the safety of the Emperor and the imperial palace. Within Constantinople, the Watch provided guards for the palace precinct, and kept a permanent garrison at the Covered Hippodrome (which was also the droungarioss seat).

As detailed in the De Ceremoniis, the Droungarios of the Watch always accompanied the Emperor and was a frequent participant in various imperial ceremonies, often accompanied by his principal aide, the akolouthos. His ceremonial dress is indicated as the skaramangion tunic and a red sagion cloak, while on some occasions he bore a sword, a mace and an axe. The latter weapon was highly unusual for a Byzantine officer, and the French scholar Rodolphe Guilland suggests that this was connected to his command of foreign troops via the akolouthos (who later notably became the commander of the axe-bearing Varangian Guard). In the 10th century, when several holders of the post were scions of the most prominent families of the military aristocracy, including Eustathios Argyros, John Kourkouas and Manuel Kourtikes, the droungarios occupied the 36th place in the imperial hierarchy and usually held the senior court dignities of anthypatos, patrikios or prōtospatharios.

List of known holders 
Note: the list does not include holders known only through their seals but otherwise unidentified, or anonymous holders.

Judicial office 
In , the office changed from military to purely judicial, and was further distinguished by acquiring the epithet "Grand" (megas)  in the 1070s. It seems that the droungarios took over the Court of the Hippodrome, extant since the mid-9th century and so known after its location in the Covered Hippodrome (or, according to an alternative interpretation, in the substructures of the main Hippodrome of Constantinople). This was followed by the creation of new courts and the restructuring of the Byzantine judicial system, so that in the Komnenian period (1081–1185), the Court of the Hippodrome or "Court of the Droungarios" (τὸ δρουγγαρικὸν δικαστήριον, to droungarikon dikastērion) was one of the seven superior civil courts, alongside those of the Eparch of the City, the dikaiodotēs, the koiaistōr, the epi tōn kriseōn, the prōtasēkrētis and the katholikos, who headed the court for fiscal affairs (dēmosiaka pragmata). The droungarios also served as an appellate court for the decisions of the epi tōn kriseōn. The holders of the post belonged to some of the most distinguished families of the civil aristocracy, including such men as Eustathios Rhomaios, John Skylitzes and Andronikos Kamateros.

List of known holders 
Note: the list does not include holders known only through their seals but otherwise unidentified, or anonymous holders.

Palaiologan era 
Following the sack of Constantinople by the Fourth Crusade in 1204, the office's continuity was broken, and when it reappears in the sources of the Palaiologan period, it had lost any judicial functions and resembled more its original military character: according to the mid-14th century Book of Offices of Pseudo-Kodinos, the Grand Droungarios of the Watch was a subordinate of the Grand Domestic, charged with the night watch and with supervising the army's scouts. In reality, however, it had become more of a sinecure and was essentially a court dignity devoid of any but ceremonial duties.

In Pseudo-Kodinos' work, the Grand Droungarios of the Watch ranks 24th in the imperial hierarchy, between the Eparch and the megas hetaireiarches. The Grand Droungarioss distinctive court dress, as reported by Pseudo-Kodinos, consisted of a gold-brocaded hat (skiadion), a plain silk kabbadion tunic and a staff (dikanikion) with a gilded knob on top, and covered with golden-red braid below. For ceremonies and festivities, he bore the domed skaranikon, of yellow and golden silk and decorated with gold wire embroidery, and with a portrait of the emperor seated on a throne in front and another with the emperor on horseback on the rear.

The dignity survived until the end of the Byzantine Empire. The historian Sphrantzes equated the Ottoman post of Agha of the Janissaries to the Grand Droungarios of the Watch.

List of known holders 
Note: the list does not include holders known only through their seals but otherwise unidentified, or anonymous holders.

References

Sources 

 
 
 
 
 
 
 
 
 
 
 
 
 

Byzantine judicial offices
Byzantine military offices
Byzantine court titles
Lists of office-holders in the Byzantine Empire